Sandra Feist is an American politician serving in the Minnesota House of Representatives since 2021. A member of the Democratic–Farmer–Labor Party, (DFL), Feist represents District 41B in the northern Twin Cities metropolitan area, which includes the cities of Columbia Heights and New Brighton, and parts of Anoka, Hennepin, and Ramsey Counties.

Early life, education and career
Feist was born and raised in Wisconsin and attended the University of Wisconsin–Madison, earning a B.A. in history and politics. She subsequently moved to New Orleans, Louisiana to sing jazz. Feist began a career in immigration law, starting as a Case Manager for David Ware & Associates. 

In 2005, while attending Loyola University New Orleans College of Law, Feist was displaced due to Hurricane Katrina. She travelled north to be with family in Minnesota. Feist transferred to William Mitchell College of Law, where she met her husband, Ben. Feist and her husband moved to New Brighton, where she opened a small firm specializing in immigration law in 2010.

She has held various leadership positions in the local American Immigration Lawyers Association chapter, including vice chair and chair. In that role, Feist expressed both praise of and disappointment with President Barack Obama's record on immigration reform. She advocated against country limits for employment-based green cards, calling them a "racist tool." Feist was critical of President Donald Trump's immigration policy and the U.S. Senate's RAISE Act.

Minnesota House of Representatives 
Feist was elected to the Minnesota House of Representatives in 2020and was reelected in 2022. She first ran after two-term DFL incumbent Mary Kunesh-Podein announced she would not seek reelection, instead running for a seat in the Minnesota State Senate. 

Feist is the vice chair of the Public Safety Finance and Policy Committee and sits on the Economic Development Finance and Policy, Education Policy, and Judiciary Finance and Civil Law Committees.

Feist authored "The Veterans Restorative Justice Act" to expand access to Veterans Treatment courts in Minnesota. She proposed a bill that would expand state oversight of youth restorative justice programs, stating "our focus has to be on prevention and intervention". Feist signed on to a letter written by Representative Ilhan Omar asking the Department of Justice to expand their investigation into the Minneapolis Police Department following the murder of George Floyd.

Feist wrote a bill that requires public schools to stock bathrooms with period products. She also carried the "Student Data Privacy Act" which would increase protections for students from disproportionate disciplinary action. She has authored a bill that would increase funding for homeless shelters in Hennepin County. Feist introduced "The Boundary Waters Permanent Protection Bill" to expand the state ban on mining and stop a proposal by Twin Metals mining.

Electoral history

Personal life
Feist lives in New Brighton, Minnesota with her husband, Ben, and has two children together.

References

External links 

 Official House of Representatives website
 Official campaign website

Living people
21st-century American women lawyers
21st-century American lawyers
Democratic Party members of the Minnesota House of Representatives
21st-century American politicians
21st-century American women politicians
Minnesota lawyers
Women state legislators in Minnesota
University of Wisconsin–Madison alumni
William Mitchell College of Law alumni
Loyola University New Orleans College of Law alumni
Year of birth missing (living people)